Type 61 may refer to:

 Type 61 frigate, a Royal Navy frigate class.
 Type 61 (tank), a Japan Ground Self-Defense Force tank
 Type 61 AAA guns (disambiguation)